Jeremiah "Jerry" Wolfe (September 28, 1924 – March 12, 2018) was a respected elder of the Eastern Band of Cherokee Indians. In 2013 he was awarded the title of "Beloved Man" by his tribe, an honor that had not been given out for more than 200 years.

Wolfe grew up in the Big Cove community on the Qualla Boundary in North Carolina. He was one of the last Cherokee stonecutters, a stickball caller, a storyteller, and a US Navy and World War II veteran. He was awarded an honorary doctorate by Western Carolina University. He was the recipient of The Order of the Long Leaf Pine in March 2017.

He was a fluent speaker of the Cherokee language and supported teaching it to young people to revive and preserve the language. In this role, he was interviewed for the documentary "First Language – The Race to Save Cherokee".

In July 2021, a segment of U.S. Route 441 (US 441), between US 74 and US 19, was named in his honor.

See also
Amanda Swimmer
Myrtle Driver Johnson

References

1924 births
2018 deaths
Eastern Band Cherokee people
United States Navy personnel of World War II
Articles containing video clips
20th-century Native Americans
21st-century Native Americans